On 4 October 2022, the Ethiopian National Defense Force launched an airstrike at a school housing internally displaced people in the town of Adi Daero in La'ilay Adiyabo, killing more than 50 and injuring at least 70 others. According to Tigrayan authorities and some witnesses the death toll was at least 65. The attack is one of the deadliest in the Tigray War.

Response 

In January, the United Nations reportedly sent a letter to Ethiopia's government, informing them of locations being used to house IDPs, including the school in Adi Daero. Billene Seyoum, the spokesperson of Ethiopia's Prime Minister Abiy Ahmed, did not comment on the letter.

See also 

 Dedebit airstrike

References 

2022 in Ethiopia
October 2022 events in Africa
Airstrikes during the Tigray War
Attacks on schools in Africa
Attacks on buildings and structures in 2022
Ethiopian Air Force
School bombings
2022 airstrikes